Scotland uses different electoral systems for elections to (the UK) Parliament, the Scottish Parliament and to local councils.  A different system was also in use between 1999 and 2019 for United Kingdom elections to the European Parliament. Historically, only First Past the Post (FPTP) was used for all elections in Scotland, but this changed in 1999 both with the introduction of D'Hondt elections to the EU Parliament and the inception the same year of the devolved Scottish Parliament. Two of the devolved legislatures in the United Kingdom - the Scottish Parliament and the Senedd - use the Additional Members System (AMS). AMS has been used for every Scottish Parliament election since 1999, with the most recent being in 2021.

Local council elections were reformed to be held under Single Transferable Vote (STV), which has proven to be proportional, unlike FPTP.

However, elections to the UK Parliament are still held under FPTP. This has led to the Scottish National Party (SNP) dominating Scottish seats in the UK Parliament. The SNP won 48/59 seats in Scotland in 2019, while the Conservative Party won 6 seats, the Liberal Democrats won 4 seats, and Labour won 1 seat.

The history of using First Past the Post in UK Parliament elections in Scotland means that the development of political parties in Scotland was affected to some extent by Duverger's Law, which causes the agglomeration of related political ideologies into a few large parties with many small parties rarely winning representation, though a four party system did develop in Scotland prior to the introduction of voting reform.

Scottish Parliament elections 
The Scottish Parliament uses the Additional Members System (AMS), a compensatory form of proportional representation, to elect MSPs.

It consists of 73 FPTP constituencies and 8 regional lists. The 8 regions are:

 Glasgow
 Lothian
 Central Scotland
 South Scotland
 Highlands and Islands
 Mid-Scotland and Fife
 West Scotland
 North East Scotland

All together, every area of Scotland has 8 MSPs (1 constituency and 7 regional). A voter is given two ballot papers, one peach coloured and the other lilac. On the constituency ballot the voter has to put a cross in the box next to one of the candidates they want to represent them. On the regional list ballot the voter does the same, but for the party they want to represent them. The regional list ballot paper is usually a lot longer than the constituency ballot paper as smaller parties have more of a chance of being elected on the regional list.

The method of figuring out which parties get the regional list seats is called the 'D'Hondt' method. The method favours parties who haven't won any constituency seats in the region so as to give fair and proportional representation. The regional seats act as a 'top-up' for the constituency seats, topping-up party totals to be more proportional.

There is an argument, however, that AMS doesn't offer proportional representation as parties can have a higher seat share than vote share. This mostly benefits the SNP as they regularly have a higher seat share than vote share in the Scottish Parliament. Also, many have called it undemocratic as when a regional list MSP resigns, a replacement is appointed by the party holding the seat, rather than a by-election taking place. This happened when Kezia Dugdale, the former Scottish Labour leader, resigned her seat in the Scottish Parliament.

Local Council elections 
Elections to Scotland's 32 councils are held under Single Transferable Vote (STV). All wards in Scotland are multi-member wards, meaning there are multiple councillors per area.

Under this system, voters must number their candidates by preference. First-preference votes are counted and the candidates with the least get eliminated, so the first-preference votes for the candidates get ignored and their second preferences get counted instead. This continues for many rounds until one candidate wins.

This has proven to be more proportional than many other systems and small parties and independents have a lot of representation in local councils due to the system, for example Highlands Council is run by independents.

UK Parliament elections 
All elections to the UK Parliament are held under First Past the Post (FPTP). There was a referendum in 2011 proposing to change the electoral system to Alternative Vote, which returned a result in favour of keeping FPTP. 

There has been reluctance from both Labour and Conservative (UK) Governments to back electoral reform, it has been argued this is because they heavily benefit from FPTP.

Under this system, voters put a cross in the box next to the candidate they want to represent their constituency, and the candidate with the most votes wins. This simplicity of this system means there is a higher turnout than elections under other systems. While this may be the case, parties with less than 50% of the vote commonly get a large majority of seats and form the government. For example, in the 1997 General election, Tony Blair's Labour Party won 43.2% of the vote, but 63.4% of seats in parliament.

References

Scotland
Politics of Scotland